Christina Blomqvist (born 22 October 1964) is a Swedish orienteering competitor. She is two times Relay World Champion as a member of the Swedish winning team in 1985 and 1991. She obtained silver in the Classic distance World Championship in 1991, and bronze in the 1985 Individual World Championship.

References

1964 births
Living people
Swedish orienteers
Female orienteers
Foot orienteers
World Orienteering Championships medalists
20th-century Swedish women